Angella ("Sandie") Richards (born 6 November 1968 in Clarendon Park) is a Jamaican track and field athlete. She was a bronze medalist in the 4x400 m relay at the 2004 Olympic Games in Athens, Greece.

Career

She was a world junior representative, finishing third in the 400 m at the 1986 Championships. The next year she won bronze at the World Student Games, followed by her Olympic debut a year later in Seoul, South Korea.

In 1998, Richards won Commonwealth gold at 1998 Commonwealth Games and won a 400 m bronze and relay gold at the 1998 Goodwill Games. She was a member of the winning 4 x 400 m relay team at the 2001 World Championships, taking Jamaica's first ever mile relay gold medal in the 18-year history of the championships. At the opening ceremony of the 2001 World Championships she captained the Jamaican team and carried the flag. She has the record for the most World Indoor final appearances with nine (five at 400 m and four at 4x400 m). She graduated in sociology from the University of Texas at Austin.

International competitions

References

1968 births
Living people
People from Clarendon Parish, Jamaica
Jamaican female sprinters
Olympic athletes of Jamaica
Olympic silver medalists for Jamaica
Olympic bronze medalists for Jamaica
Commonwealth Games medallists in athletics
Athletes (track and field) at the 1988 Summer Olympics
Athletes (track and field) at the 1992 Summer Olympics
Athletes (track and field) at the 1996 Summer Olympics
Athletes (track and field) at the 2000 Summer Olympics
Athletes (track and field) at the 2004 Summer Olympics
Medalists at the 2004 Summer Olympics
Commonwealth Games gold medallists for Jamaica
Commonwealth Games bronze medallists for Jamaica
Athletes (track and field) at the 1994 Commonwealth Games
Athletes (track and field) at the 1998 Commonwealth Games
Athletes (track and field) at the 2002 Commonwealth Games
Pan American Games medalists in athletics (track and field)
Athletes (track and field) at the 1987 Pan American Games
Athletes (track and field) at the 1991 Pan American Games
Athletes (track and field) at the 1999 Pan American Games
World Athletics Championships athletes for Jamaica
World Athletics Championships medalists
Junior college women's track and field athletes in the United States
Medalists at the 2000 Summer Olympics
Olympic silver medalists in athletics (track and field)
Olympic bronze medalists in athletics (track and field)
Pan American Games bronze medalists for Jamaica
Universiade medalists in athletics (track and field)
Central American and Caribbean Games gold medalists for Jamaica
Competitors at the 1998 Central American and Caribbean Games
Goodwill Games medalists in athletics
Universiade bronze medalists for Jamaica
World Athletics Indoor Championships winners
World Athletics Indoor Championships medalists
World Athletics Championships winners
Central American and Caribbean Games medalists in athletics
Medalists at the 1987 Summer Universiade
Competitors at the 1998 Goodwill Games
Competitors at the 2001 Goodwill Games
Medalists at the 1987 Pan American Games
Medalists at the 1991 Pan American Games
Olympic female sprinters
Medallists at the 1994 Commonwealth Games
Medallists at the 1998 Commonwealth Games
Medallists at the 2002 Commonwealth Games